Lottinghen is a commune in the Pas-de-Calais department in the Hauts-de-France region of France.

Geography
Lottinghen is situated about 14 mi east of Boulogne, at the junction of the D204 and D254 roads.

Population

History
On March 13, 1944, the Ninth Air Force attacked a "V-weapon" site at Lottinghen.

Places of interest
 The church, dating from the seventeenth century.

See also
Communes of the Pas-de-Calais department

References

Communes of Pas-de-Calais